"All the Young Dudes" is a 1972 song by David Bowie, recorded and released by Mott the Hoople.

All the Young Dudes may also refer to:

 All the Young Dudes (album), a 1972 Mott the Hopple album containing and named for the song
 All the Young Dudes (fan fiction), a 2018 Harry Potter fan fiction by MsKingBean89
 All the Young Dudes (radio show), a 2001 BBC drama radio show
 "All the Young Dudes", a 2019 episode of Carole & Tuesday

See also 
 The Young Dudes, an indie rock band from California started in 2010
 All the Young Men, a 1960 film about the racial integration of the US military